Shailesh Lakhman Vara (born 4 September 1960) is a Ugandan-British politician, who served as Secretary of State for Northern Ireland from July to September 2022. A member of the Conservative Party, he has served as the Member of Parliament (MP) for North West Cambridgeshire since 2005.

Vara served as a Vice-Chairman of the Conservative Party from 2001 to 2005. After two unsuccessful attempts to be elected to the House of Commons, he was elected as the MP for North West Cambridgeshire at the 2005 general election, succeeding Brian Mawhinney as the Conservative MP for the seat. In 2006, he was appointed to the shadow ministerial post of Shadow Deputy Leader of the House of Commons by David Cameron. 

Vara served in the Cameron government as Parliamentary Under-Secretary of State for Courts and Legal Aid from 2013 to 2016 and as Parliamentary Under-Secretary of State for Work and Pensions from 2015 to 2016. He returned to the backbenches in July 2016, having been removed from his positions by the new Prime Minister Theresa May. In the January 2018 reshuffle, he re-entered government as Minister of State at the Northern Ireland Office (NIO), serving under Karen Bradley. In November 2018, Vara resigned from this role in opposition to May's draft Brexit withdrawal agreement. During the July 2022 United Kingdom government crisis, Vara was appointed by Boris Johnson as Secretary of State for Northern Ireland but was dismissed by Liz Truss on 6 September 2022.

Early life
Born in Uganda to Gujarati Indian immigrants on 4 September 1960, Vara moved to Britain with his family in 1964 when he was four and had a Hindu upbringing. Educated at Aylesbury Grammar School and Brunel University, Vara qualified as a solicitor.

He worked in the City and West End of London, and during 1989–1990, in Hong Kong. Vara has been a senior legal adviser and business consultant for London First, and is vice-president of the Small Business Bureau.

Political career
Vara has been involved with the Conservative Party since the late 1980s and has held various posts at local, regional and national levels. He served as a Vice-Chairman of the Conservative Party from 2001 to 2005. In this position, he had a broad range of responsibilities, including advising Michael Howard, deputising for the Party chairman, party spokesman with the media and looking after Conservative Future (which comprises the 10,000 or so people in the party under 30).

Vara was elected Member of Parliament for North West Cambridgeshire in May 2005. He had previously contested the Birmingham Ladywood seat at the 1997 general election, which Labour's Clare Short won easily, and Northampton South in the 2001 general election, which Vara failed to win by only 885 votes.

At the Conservative Party Conference in 2000, he was awarded the accolade of official "rising star" of the Party, with Lord Alexander of Weedon describing him as a "future Conservative Party leader".

In the run-up to the 2001 general election, Vara was a member of the Party's manifesto teams for Law and Order and Legal Affairs.

On 30 June 2016, Vara confirmed his support for Michael Gove in the impending Conservative leadership contest. Vara said "I have worked very closely with Michael Gove at the Ministry of Justice and have been very impressed with him. He is a man of conviction with a very sharp intellect. He cares passionately about Britain and I believe he has the necessary qualities to lead our negotiations with the EU."

In the 2019 Conservative leadership election, he initially backed the ultimately unsuccessful candidacy of Dominic Raab.

Breast Cancer Bill
The Breast Cancer Bill was Vara's chosen issue after he was one of 20 MPs who were selected at random to introduce a private member's bill to the House of Commons in 2006. He has campaigned to broaden the age of routine breast cancer screening for women from the present 50–70 age group to 45–75 years. The proposal was not supported by the government, which Vara claimed effectively blocked its progress by talking through to the end of the debate.

Vara has given his backing to Breast Cancer Campaigns (BCC) award-winning national "wear it pink" day, and showed his support for breast cancer charity Breakthrough Breast Cancer at a meeting in the House of Commons.

Resignation as Northern Ireland Minister
Early on 15 November 2018, Vara announced his resignation as a Northern Ireland Minister on Twitter, posting his letter of resignation. His resignation followed the previous day's marathon-length cabinet meeting to discuss the draft Brexit withdrawal agreement.

Vara was opposed to Brexit prior to the referendum on the UK's continued EU membership in June 2016. However, Vara resigned from his role at the Northern Ireland Office as he did not believe the Government's proposed exit agreement honoured the outcome of the referendum.

Secretary of State for Northern Ireland
On 7 July 2022, Vara was appointed as Secretary of State for Northern Ireland by outgoing Prime Minister Boris Johnson, replacing Brandon Lewis. He was sworn as a member of the Her Majesty's Most Honourable Privy Council on 8 July, entitling him to the style "The Right Honourable" for life. He was dismissed by Liz Truss on 6 September.

Personal life
Vara has a black belt in Tae Kwon Do.

See also
Conservative Future
North West Cambridgeshire (UK Parliament constituency)

References

External links
Official website

 Conservative Party – Shailesh Vara 
Guardian Unlimited Politics – Ask Aristotle: Shailesh Vara MP
The Times : Election 2005 
Guardian – Class of 2005
Telegraph – Vara Interview 

1960 births
Living people
Alumni of Brunel University London
British Hindus
British politicians of Indian descent
Conservative Party (UK) MPs for English constituencies
English people of Indian descent
Gujarati people
Northern Ireland Office junior ministers
People educated at Aylesbury Grammar School
Recipients of Pravasi Bharatiya Samman
Ugandan emigrants to the United Kingdom
UK MPs 2005–2010
UK MPs 2010–2015
UK MPs 2015–2017
UK MPs 2017–2019
UK MPs 2019–present
British male taekwondo practitioners
Secretaries of State for Northern Ireland
Members of the Privy Council of the United Kingdom